René III of Renesse, Viscount of Montenaecken, Baron of Gaesbeeck, Lord of Elderen (ca. 1580 – Liège, 17 April 1637) was a Dutch nobleman, who became the 1st Count of Warfusée in 1609. He acquired  Gaasbeek Castle in 1615.

Family

He was the eldest son of Guillaume de Renesse, lord of Warfusée and Anne of Rubempré, granddaughter of Charles IV, Lord of Rubempré. His Great-grand father was Henry III of Nassau-Breda, his grand mother was a legitimised daughter of Nassau. In 1610 he married Alberta of Egmont, daughter of Charles, 7th Count of Egmont, Prince de Gavre. After his death he was followed by His son Alexander de Renesse, 2nd Count of Warfusée.

René de Renesse, 1st Count of Warfusée;Married to Albertine of Egmont
Maria de Renesse-Warfusée (c.1620-?);Married to Peter of Lalaing, Count of Rennenberg
Florence-Marguerite de Renesse-Warfusée (c.1620-?);married to Eugène de Berghes, 2nd count of Grimbergen.
Philippe François de Berghes, 1st Prince of Grimberghen
Louise-Elisabeth de Renesse-Warfusée
Alexander de Renesse, Baron of Gaesbeeck.

Career 
He was chairman of the Board of Finances in the Netherlands under Philip IV of Spain. He also commanded a royal regiment of Spanish troops, as well as travelling regularly to Holland to the States-General of the Netherlands. He was involved in the Conspiracy of Nobles (1632) and made efforts to convince France to invade the Southern Netherlands in support of a planned revolt against Spanish rule. Accused of abuse of his office before the plan came to fruition, he fled to Liège and issued a manifesto against the government in Brussels. Charged with high treason, he was sentenced to banishment and his property was confiscated. He soon sought reconciliation with the Spanish government. On 16 April 1637 he invited the anti-Spanish mayor of Liège, Sébastien de La Ruelle, to a banquet to be held in his house the next day. Once he had him as a guest in his house, he had him killed by hidden Spanish troops. Renesse was then lynched by an angry mob.

Possessions 

 In 1609 he became 1st Count of Warfusée by decree of Emperor Rudolf II
 In 1615 he bought the estate of Heeze from Cleradius van Genève Lullin. 
 In the same year he became the Baron of Gaesbeeck.

Memory
Renesse's conspiracy to murder the mayor of Liège formed the plot of a novel by Hendrik Conscience, Le Bourgmestre de Liège (1865).

Ancestry

References

1580s births
1637 deaths
Counts of Renesse
Dutch people of the Eighty Years' War (Spanish Empire)
Dutch people of the Eighty Years' War (United Provinces)